Maculonecroscia is a genus of stick insects in the tribe Necrosciini, erected by F Seow-Choen in 2016.  Species distribution records are probably incomplete, but include India, China, Indochina (Vietnam) and west Malesia.

Species
The Phasmida Species File lists:
 Maculonecroscia braggi Seow-Choen, 2016 - type species
 Maculonecroscia heros (Redtenbacher, 1908)
 Maculonecroscia menaka (Wood-Mason, 1877)
 Maculonecroscia perplexus (Redtenbacher, 1908)
 Maculonecroscia shukayi (Bi, Zhang & Lau, 2001)

References

External links

Phasmatodea genera
Phasmatodea of Asia
Lonchodidae